Wright Brook is a river in Delaware County, New York. It drains Creamery Pond and flows south before converging with the West Branch Delaware River south of Bloomville.

References

Rivers of New York (state)
Rivers of Delaware County, New York
Tributaries of the West Branch Delaware River